Pyrrosia longifolia is a species of fern growing in south east Asia, the Pacific region and Australia.

References 

 
Polypodiaceae
Ferns of Australia
Flora of Asia
Flora of the Pacific
Epiphytes
Plants described in 1768
Taxa named by Nicolaas Laurens Burman